Personnel Armor System for Ground Troops (PASGT, pronounced  ) is a combat helmet and ballistic vest that was used by the United States military from the early 1980s until the mid-2000s, when the helmet and vest were succeeded by the Lightweight Helmet (LWH), Modular Integrated Communications Helmet (MICH), and Interceptor Body Armor (IBA) respectively.

Designed in the mid-1970s as a replacement for the M1 helmet and previous fragmentation vests, prototypes of the PASGT were tested in the late 1970s before being fielded in the early 1980s. In the early 2000s, the PASGT vest began being replaced by the IBA and the PASGT helmet was replaced soon thereafter with the LWH and MICH. As of 2018, the only remaining U.S. military users of PASGT in any capacity are the U.S. Army Reserve and the U.S. Navy, the latter of which retains the PASGT helmet for use by sailors aboard its warships, in addition to a PASGT-derived vest known as the "U.S. Navy Flak Jacket".

Name
PASGT is an acronym, standing for Personnel Armor System for Ground Troops. When used by itself, PASGT refers to both the vest and helmet together.

In the U.S. military, the PASGT helmet was most commonly known by its wearers as simply the "Kevlar". The nickname has since been adopted for usage with other helmets. The PASGT helmet was also referred to by its wearers in the U.S. military as the "K-pot", similar in name to the colloquial nickname "steel pot" for the steel M1 helmet, which was in widespread U.S. military usage from the 1940s, to the 1970s, including the Vietnam War. The PASGT helmet was also, but less commonly, known by its wearers as the "Fritz" helmet for its resemblance to the Stahlhelm, which was the standard helmet used by the German military forces in the First and Second World Wars.

On the other hand, the PASGT vest was colloquially known as the "flak jacket" or "flak vest" by its wearers in the U.S. military, a continuation of the nickname from earlier nylon and fiberglass-based protective vests.

Helmet

The PASGT helmet is a combat helmet first employed by the U.S. military in 1983 and eventually adopted by many other military and law enforcement agencies internationally. The shell is made from 19 layers of Kevlar, a ballistic aramid fabric treated with a phenolic resin system, and is rated at Threat Level IIIA. The helmet offers protection against shrapnel and ballistic threats.

Overview
The PASGT helmet is typically painted olive drab, though other colors such as tan, grey, and black could also be used. Camouflage was available in the form of cloth helmet covers with varying camouflage patterns, such as woodland, six-color desert, and three-color desert. Some PASGT helmets were retrofitted with newer camouflage colors, such as the Universal Camouflage Pattern and MultiCam.

Outside military use, the PASGT helmet has been used by SWAT teams, where it is often painted black. It has also been used by United Nations peacekeepers, where it is often painted United Nations blue.

When worn with a helmet cover, the PASGT helmet is often fitted with a band around it that has two light recharging glow patches (sometimes known as "cat eyes") on the rear, intended to reduce friendly fire incidents. These bands are also used to hold vegetation or small personal items, as with the M1 helmet before it. These bands can have names and blood types printed on them to identify the wearer and their blood type in the event of a casualty. In the U.S. Army, PASGT helmets often featured a patch with the wearer's rank insignia on it stitched onto the front, and/or a second patch showing the symbol of the wearer's unit on the sides. The U.S. Marines wore the Eagle, Globe, and Anchor insignia on the front of the helmet as an iron-on transfer, similar to the one worn by Marines on the breast pocket of the BDU. This practice continued with the adoption of the LWH, but fell out of use and was discontinued because the mounting base for night vision devices covered the emblem, and required a hole in the fabric to attach, defacing the symbol.

Development
The PASGT helmet was developed by the U.S. Army Soldier Systems Center after the Vietnam War during the mid-to-late 1970s. It completely replaced the steel M1 helmet in U.S. military service by the end of the 1980s. It first saw use in combat in 1983 during Operation Urgent Fury in Grenada, became standard issue for the U.S. military in 1985, and completely replaced the M1 helmet for frontline troops by the end of the decade. Army units stationed in Alaska were the last to receive the helmets, some not getting the PASGT until 1988.

Accessories
Various add-on accessories were developed for the PASGT helmet, including a helmet mount assembly to attach night vision goggles and a riot protection helmet visor mount.

Replacement
The PASGT helmet was replaced in U.S. military service by the Lightweight Helmet for the U.S. Marine Corps and the Modular Integrated Communications Helmet by the U.S. Army, which was in turn replaced by the Advanced Combat Helmet.

Both were eventually replaced by the Enhanced Combat Helmet (ECH) around 2012 and 2014.

The PASGT system is still used by some U.S. allies and still sees some continued limited use in the U.S. military as of 2017, serving as one of the options available for sailors assigned to duty aboard U.S. Navy vessels.

Vest

The PASGT vest was the U.S. military's standard upper torso body armor from the mid-1980s up until the early 2000s, when it was replaced by the Outer Tactical Vest of the Interceptor body armor system. The PASGT vest replaced the M-69 Fragmentation Protective Body Armor nylon vest used by the Army, and the M-1955 Fragmentation Protective Body Army nylon and doron plate vest used by the Marine Corps.

The PASGT vest used Kevlar for the first time in the U.S. military's body armor, unlike the ballistic nylon that was used in the models of body armor that preceded it. While generally incapable of stopping rifle bullets, the PASGT vest provided better protection against shrapnel and reduced the severity of injuries from small arms fire when compared to the M-69. Despite its ability to stop pistol rounds, including 9×19mm Parabellum FMJ, the vest was only ever designed or intended to stop small fragments without injury to the user. Based on testing conducted for the Brass Fetcher Ballistic Testing Company, former ARDEC research engineer John Ervin stated that the PASGT vest is equivalent to NIJ level II or IIA protection: able to stop multiple 124-grain 9x19mm FMJ pistol rounds to its main torso panels (front and back), but susceptible to several closely spaced rounds or shots to the thin neck and shoulder panels. Another independent test, featured in the magazine GunNews, claimed that the PASGT vest could stop .357 Magnum Federal 125 grain JHP, .357 Magnum S&W 158 grain JSP, 9mm Federal 115 grain FMJ, and 9mm +P+ Corbon 115 grain FMJ at a range of 10 yards, though was penetrated by a second closely spaced shot of 9mm Federal FMJ after the first.

Appearance
The PASGT vest is typically covered with woodland pattern nylon fabric, either the ERDL pattern or U.S. Woodland. A very limited number of vests were made in olive drab, but only woodland versions were issued to U.S. forces. Like the PASGT helmet, camouflage covers were available to be worn atop the vest in various patterns. Early camouflage covers were in DBDU but later came in the DCU pattern.

Development
The PASGT vest was designed in 1975 and was tested by in the late 1970s before being fielded in the early 1980s.

U.S. Navy Flak Jacket
In January 2000, the U.S. Navy began using a derivative variant of the PASGT vest known as the "U.S. Navy Flak Jacket Mk 1, Mod 0". This vest was still being used by the U.S. Navy as late as April 2017. The USN Flak Jacket is sage green or brown in color. Although this vest is quite similar in appearance to the PASGT vest, it actually is a different model of vest altogether.

Accessories and usage
In order to provide protection against high velocity bullets, the PASGT vest was, in 1996, combined with the Interim Small Arms Protective Overvest (ISAPO) pending the adoption of Interceptor body armor. The ballistic fill consists of 13 plies of 14 oz. water repellent treated Aramid (Kevlar 29) fabric. The inner and outer cover, 
shoulder pads and front closure flap of the vest are water repellent treated 8 oz. ballistic nylon cloth.

While it had been phased out as frontline body armor by the start of the Iraq War in 2003, the PASGT vest saw some limited wear and usage by U.S. military personnel during the early stages of the war, where it was worn behind the frontlines by rear-echelon support personnel and navy sailors such as Seabees. Some U.S. Army soldiers used old PASGT vests as makeshift armor for their vehicles in the absence of actual up-armor kits.

Replacement
The PASGT vest was succeeded in U.S. military service by the Outer Tactical Vest of the Interceptor Body Armor system, which was, in turn, partly replaced by the Modular Tactical Vest, Improved Outer Tactical Vest, and Scalable Plate Carrier. However, the PASGT vest still sees some limited use in the U.S. military as of 2016, where it serves as one of many vests for sailors assigned to duty on board U.S. Navy vessels.

Users

Current
 : Uses ArmorSource-made PASGT helmets provided through FMS sales.
 : Used by the Argentine Army.
 : Uses both U.S. and Brazilian-made PASGT helmets.
 : Adopted by the Bolivian Armed Forces in the 1990s.
 : Both the vest and helmet are used by the Bosnian armed forces.
 : Used since 1990s by various Costa Rican public security units.
 : Used by the Dominican military, replacing all M1 helmets.
 : Ecuadorian-made PASGT helmets in use by the military.
 : Used in El Salvadorian military to replace M1 helmets.
 : Used by Hellenic Army.
 : Used by Haitian National Police.
 : Used by most Honduran military units.
: Locally made PASGT helmets, Standard issue for Indonesian Armed Forces and the Indonesian Police.
 : Used by Iraqi commandos operating under Counter-Terrorism Service mandate.
 : Used by the Israeli military, most supplied by the U.S. with some made by Orlite.
 : Standard issue helmet of the Lebanese Armed Forces
 : Mexican military uses both American and Mexican-made PASGT helmets.
 : PASGT helmets have been used since the 1990s by the Nicaraguan military.
 : PASGT helmets replaced M1s in the Paraguayan military.
 : Standard issue for Philippine Army and Philippine Marine Corps.
 : Used by Portuguese Army.
 : Used by Saudi Arabian Army and Saudi Arabian National Guard.
 : Used by the Slovenian Special Police Unit (Specialna Enota Policije).
 : Taiwanese-made PASGT helmets made for the Taiwanese military.
 : PASGT Used by Royal Thai Army and Royal Thai Marine Corps Since 1984 
 : PASGT used by Amphibious Marine Brigade.
 
  United States Army Reserve: Limited numbers still used as of August 2018.
 : PASGT vests were still used by the U.S. Navy aboard its warships as of June 2016. The U.S. Navy also uses a PASGT-derived vest known as the "U.S. Navy Flak Jacket". PASGT helmets are still used by the U.S. Navy aboard its warships as of January 2017.
 : Used by Aidar/Donbas Battalions.
 : Mostly used by Uruguayan UN peacekeepers. Some are used by the National Police of Uruguay.
 : Uses PASGT helmets made in China for the Venezuelan military.
: Uses Vietnamese-made PASGT helmets, as well as imported Israeli ones.

Former
 : Australian-made M91 variant produced by RBR Armor Systems and American-made helmets used by the Australian Defence Force from the 1990s until 2005. Replaced by the Enhanced Combat Helmet.
 : PASGT helmets were first seen trialed by troops during Exercise Reforger 83 but only saw limited adoption by the Canadian Army in the early 1990s to replace the M1 helmet during United Nations peacekeeping activities in the Balkans, Somalia and Rwanda. The PASGT helmets were phased out by the mid 2000s with the adoption of the CG634 in 1997 and full production and acquisition of the helmet for active service. Canadian Forces also used body armour based on the PASGT to replace the older M69 fragmentation vests as early as 1990, seen during the Oka Crisis and would be used till the mid 2000s when it was fully replaced by the CTS Body Armour System from Pacific Safety Products.
 : PASGT helmets replaced by Delta manufactured combat helmets.
 : PASGT helmets formerly used by the Singapore Armed Forces made by International Scientific Pte Ltd. with some refurbished by All Defense Technology Pte Ltd.
 
 : Replaced by the Interceptor body armor and Modular Integrated Communications Helmet.
 : Replaced by the Lightweight Helmet and Interceptor Body Armor.
  Los Angeles Police Department: PASGT helmets were formerly used by the LAPD SWAT.

PASGT helmet variants and derivatives

See also
 Interceptor Multi-Threat Body Armor System, the body armor that succeeded the PASGT vest in U.S. military service

References

Further reading
 PASGT Helmet Operator's Manual
 PASGT Helmet Use and Care Manual

External links

 1970s photographs of the PASGT in development
 The Box o' Truth tests the PASGT helmet against common rounds
 PASGT Helmet Technical Datasheet

Body armor
Combat helmets of the United States
Military equipment introduced in the 1980s